The Battle of Qingshanli was fought over six days in October 1920 between the Imperial Japanese Army and Korean armed groups in a densely wooded region of eastern Manchuria called Qīngshānlǐ (Seizanri; , Cheongsanri). It occurred during the campaign of the Japanese army in Jiandao, during the Japanese rule of Korea (1910–1945).

Background
After the March 1st Movement of 1919 by Koreans calling for liberation from Japanese occupation, some Korean activists formed an independence army in Manchuria. The Japanese government asked China to subdue them but got no substantive result.

On October 2, 1920, the Independence Army raided Hun-ch'un and killed 13 Japanese including the commissioner of the consulate police. In response, Japan decided to send troops to eastern Manchuria. Japan immediately held talks with China, and on October 16 received permission for military action in eastern Jilin from the governor of Jilin.

Status of the battles according to Korean sources
The Japanese forces who joined the expedition were the 28th Brigade of the 19th Division, which was on its way back to Japan, and two units from the 11th and 13th Divisions who had been sent to Vladivostok.  Among them, only the 19th Division of the Choson Army of Japan, part of the Imperial Japanese Army garrisoned in Korea, launched an actual military operation and the rest contained a lockdown and a demonstration. The 19th Division was deployed to Hunchun (Isobayashi Detachment), Wangqing (Kimura Detachment) and Yanji-Helong (Azuma Detachment). The Isobayashi and Kimura detachments engaged in no major combat.

From October 21 to 23, the Northern military administration office army led by Kim Jwa-jin lured some of Japanese soldiers and attacked them in Baiyunping, Quanshuiping and Wanlougou. Although the Korean force was small and used guerilla warfare, they were victorious. The Japanese force, who were defeated by the Korean Independent Army, appealed for help to the Azuma Detachment. They were rushed in for the relief of the remnants to fight against the Korean Independence Army.

The Azuma Detachment engaged in combat with the Korean Independence Army on October 23. The Northern military administration office army united the Korea independent army led by Hong Beom-do in the struggle against Japanese force. The Korean troops had the Japanese Azuma Detachment at a disadvantage, and the two forces fought the final battle in the Yulang town. The Korean army claimed to have killed 1,200 Japanese soldiers, and wounded thousands of others on October 26, though the number of casualties during the battle is still debated on. As a result of the battle, Korean forces retreated from the area and the Japanese army kept pursuing them.

In response to these claims, Kim Hak-Cheor (also known as Song Jin-woo), who participated in many battles as a member of the armed group for the independence of Korea, argued that the number of Japanese casualties was exaggerated by a factor of 300 or more. According to him, when Korean independence forces encountered the Japanese army, they lost 9 out of 10 times, and even if they won, they could only kill 2 or 3 Japanese soldiers.

Controversies

Hunchun massacre
South Korea views the Hunchun incident as a deception by Japan, who they believe used it as an excuse to dispatch troops.

Casualties of the Japanese army
Japanese sources claim 11 dead and 24 wounded, and no officer casualties. These numbers are repeated by the list of the fallen soldiers of the Yasukuni Shrine. Japanese investigation of weapons of the 19th Division after the expedition claims that the Japanese army consumed little.

The only Japanese soldier Korean sources name was "Regimental Commander Kanō." "The Bloody History of the Korean Independence Movement" states that a secret paper by a Japanese consul reported Regimental Commander Kanō's death, although Japan has not revealed such a report so far. Japan claims the only man corresponding to "Regimental Commander Kanō" was Colonel Nobuteru Kanō, who served as commander of the 27th regiment, and that his name cannot be found in the casualty list, but is said to have led the regiment until 1922. Moreover, two months after the Battle of Qingshanli, the regiment commanded by Colonel Kanō captured one Korean. This event is recorded in a secret telegram from the Japanese consulate in Qingshanli on November 13, 1920.

On the contrary, South Koreans refer to this battle as the "great victory at Cheongsalli" and consider it a victory of the Independence Army. For the casualties of the Japanese army, Chosun Doknip Undongji Hyulsa by Bak Inseok (1920) states "900-1,600 including Regimental Commander Kanō," Daehan Minguk jeongdangsa compiled by the National Election Commission (1964) "over 1,000," Hanguk jeonjaengsa by the Military History Compilation Committee of the Ministry of National Defense (1967) "3,300 dead and wounded," and Hanguk Minjok Undongsa by Jo Jihun (1975) "3,300 including Regimental Commander Kanō."

According to Kim Hak-Cheor, who participated in many battles as a member of the armed group for the independence of Korea, the number of Japanese casualties that Koreans claimed was exaggerated more than 300 times.

References

Notes

Bibliography
JACAR Ref.C03022770200, Chōsengun Shireibu: Kantō shuppeishi
Sasaki Harutaka (佐々木春隆): Kankoku dokuritsu undōshi jō no "Seizanri taisen" kō (韓国独立運動史上の「青山里大戦」考), Gunji shigaku, Vol.15 No. 3, pp. 22–34, 1979.
Sasaki Harutaka (佐々木春隆): Chōsen sensō zenshi to shite no Kankoku dokuritsu undō no kenkyū (朝鮮戦争前史としての韓国独立運動の研究), 1985.
Zdenka Klöslová Czech Arms for Korean Independence Fighters. Archiv Orientální - Quarterly Journal of African and Asian Studies. Vol. LXXI (2003), no. 1, p. 55–64. ISSN 0044-8699

Korean independence movement
Battles involving Japan
Battles involving Korea
Conflicts in 1920
1920 in Japan
1920 in Korea
October 1920 events
1920 in China
History of Jilin
History of Yanbian